Pat Carey (born 9 November 1947) is a former Irish Fianna Fáil politician. He was a Teachta Dála (TD) for the Dublin North-West constituency from 1997 to 2011. He served as the Minister for Community, Equality and Gaeltacht Affairs from 2010 to 2011, and also as Government Chief Whip from 2008 to 2010.

Early and private life
Carey was born in Castlemaine, County Kerry in 1947. He was educated at Presentation Brothers College, Milltown, County Kerry and went to St. Patrick's College in Drumcondra, Dublin to complete his teacher training. He subsequently studied at University College Dublin and Trinity College Dublin where he received a Bachelor of Arts degree and a H.Dip. in Education respectively. Before entering politics Carey was a national school teacher and a deputy principal.

Since leaving office, Carey came out as gay, and voiced support for the 2015 marriage equality referendum, saying "My only regret is that I didn't have the courage or confidence to [come out while in politics]. When I look back it's an awful pity I didn't feel able to do that. Nobody stopped me, but I wasn't sure how it would be received."

Political career
Carey entered local politics in 1985 when he was elected to Dublin City Council for the Finglas area. He remained on the council until the abolition of the dual mandate in 2003. He was elected as a Fianna Fáil Teachta Dála (TD) for the constituency of Dublin North-West at the 1997 general election, defeating the sitting Fine Gael TD Mary Flaherty to win a second seat for the Fianna Fáil in the 4-seater constituency. He was re-elected at the 2002 general election.

Re-elected at the 2007 general election, he was appointed as Minister of State at the Department of Community, Rural and Gaeltacht Affairs with special responsibility for Drugs Strategy and Community Affairs. When Brian Cowen became Taoiseach in May 2008, Carey was appointed as Minister of State at the Department of the Taoiseach with responsibility as Government Chief Whip and Active Citizenship and as Minister of State at the Department of Defence.

On 23 March 2010, he was appointed as Minister for Community, Equality and Gaeltacht Affairs. On 20 January 2011, Carey was also appointed as Minister for Transport, following the resignation of Noel Dempsey. On 23 January 2011, Carey was also appointed as Minister for Communications, Energy and Natural Resources, following the resignation of Eamon Ryan.

He lost his seat at the 2011 general election. On 28 March 2011, the Sunday Independent reported that Carey had "appointed another party crony to a key State board on his final day in office".

In November 2015, Carey stepped down as Fianna Fáil's director of elections.

References

1947 births
Living people
Alumni of St Patrick's College, Dublin
Alumni of University College Dublin
Alumni of Trinity College Dublin
Fianna Fáil TDs
Gay politicians
Government Chief Whip (Ireland)
Irish schoolteachers
LGBT conservatism
LGBT legislators in Ireland
Local councillors in Dublin (city)
Members of the 28th Dáil
Members of the 29th Dáil
Members of the 30th Dáil
Ministers for Transport (Ireland)
Ministers of State of the 30th Dáil
Politicians from County Kerry